The 1995 Spanish Grand Prix was a Formula One motor race held on 14 May 1995 at the Circuit de Catalunya, Montmeló. It was the fourth race of the 1995 Formula One season. It proved to be the final race for 1992 Formula One champion Nigel Mansell, who quit the McLaren team after the race. Both Damon Hill and Rubens Barrichello experienced gearbox problems on the final lap, Hill dropping from 2nd (which would have kept him in the lead of the championship) to 4th, and Barrichello from 6th to 7th. This gave the Benetton team their second, and ultimately final, 1–2 finish.

Summary
The green light failed to illuminate at the start, leaving the start to be indicated only by the red lights being turned off. Michael Schumacher led from start to finish on a two stop strategy. His team mate Johnny Herbert left the pits with the rear jack attached to his car, while Bertrand Gachot suffered a small refuelling fire when pulling away from his second stop.

Mansell's brief spell with the McLaren team came to an end when he retired the MP4/10 in the pits when already well down the order, complaining of poor handling. On the last lap Hill, lying second, suffered a hydraulic problem which saw him crawl across the line in fourth. This allowed Herbert to finish second, his best finish to date and his first ever podium finish. Barrichello had a similar problem losing sixth to Panis – both incidents were unseen by the TV coverage.

Classification

Qualifying

Race

Championship standings after the race 

Drivers' Championship standings

Constructors' Championship standings

Note: Only the top five positions are included for both sets of standings.

References 

Spanish Grand Prix
Spanish Grand Prix
Spanish Grand Prix
Spanish Grand Prix